Rosedale Cemetery is a cemetery located at the tripoint of Orange, West Orange and Montclair in Essex County, New Jersey, United States. Cyrus Baldwin drew up the original plan for the cemetery in 1840.

Notable interments 

 Platt Adams (1885–1961), American Olympic athlete and member of the New Jersey State Assembly from Essex County
 Jim Barnes (1886–1966), golfer
 John L. Blake (1831–1899), represented New Jersey's 6th congressional district from 1879–1881
 Dudley Buck (1839–1909), organist, composer, writer
 Samuel Colgate (1822–1897), founder of Colgate-Palmolive
 Charles Edison (1890–1969), son of Thomas Edison and the 42nd Governor of New Jersey
 Frank Emil Fesq (1840–1920), American Civil War Medal of Honor recipient.
 Wilfred J. Funk (1883–1965), lexicographer (Funk & Wagnalls)
 Althea Gibson (1927–2003), the first African American woman to be a competitor on the world tennis tour
 Henry Judd Gray (1892–1928), murderer of Albert Snyder
 George Huntington Hartford (1833–1917), Mayor of Orange, New Jersey from 1878–1890 and owned the Great Atlantic and Pacific Tea Company, the country's largest food retailer at the time of his death
 Frances Cox Henderson (1820–1897), wife of Governor James Pinckney Henderson of Texas, retired in East Orange, established Good Shepherd home for aged women
 James Curtis Hepburn (1815–1911), physician, philologist, missionary.
 George Inness (1825–1894), painter
 George Inness Jr. (1854–1926), painter
 Frank Louis Kramer (1880–1958), cyclist
 Hazel May Kuser (?–1924), Radium Girl
 Mary Artemisia Lathbury (1841–1913), poet and hymnwriter
 Amelia Maggia (?–1922), Radium Girl
 Lowell Mason (1792–1872), hymn composer and music educator
 Quinta Maggia McDonald (?–1929), Radium Girl
 Charles Follen McKim (1847–1909), architect
 George W. Merck (1894–1957), pharmacist, president of Merck & Co.
 John Pingry (1818–1894), minister, founder of the Pingry School
 Ruth A. Saxer (?–1942), Radium Girl
 George J. Seabury (1844–1909), chemist and pharmacist
 Michelle Thomas (1968–1998), American actress best known for roles in Family Matters and The Cosby Show
 Aaron B. Tompkins (1844–1931), American Civil War Medal of Honor recipient.
William A. Wachenfeld (1889 – 1969) was a Justice of the New Jersey Supreme Court from 1946 to 1959.
George James Webb (1803–1887), composer
 William H. Wiley (1842–1925), represented New Jersey's 8th congressional district from 1909–1911
 Earl Williams (1948–2013), professional baseball player
 Three British Commonwealth war servicemen – a Royal Air Force officer and Canadian Army Sergeant of World War I and a Canadian airman of World War II

References

External links
 Rosedale Cemetery (Official)
 Rosedale Cemetery Walking Guide of Notable Interments
 Rosedale Cemetery at Find a Grave

Orange, New Jersey
Cemeteries in Essex County, New Jersey